Sarah Lafleur is a Canadian actress, most recognizable for her roles in Ugly Betty (ABC), The Mentalist (CBS), Grey's Anatomy (ABC), CSI: NY (CBS), Crossing Jordan (NBC), Without a Trace (CBS), Playmakers (ESPN); and the films Shall We Dance? (Miramax), Master Spy: The Robert Hanssen Story (CBS) and Daydream Believers: The Monkees Story (VH1). She also narrated several seasons of My Fair Wedding with David Tutera (WEtv), but is Best Known as the Original voice of Sailor Uranus for the first English Dub of Sailor Moon, Ansa from Land Lock, and the first English voice behind Trish in Devil May Cry. Lafleur was part of the year 2000 cast of History Bites (History Channel) nominated for a Gemini Award in the Best Performance by an Ensemble Cast in a Music, Variety Program category. But as of 2021 it is unknown what Movies, TV Shows, Anime, Cartoons & Video Games she has starred in after 2015 when she was last seen on Bones. She also has no known official social media profiles & pages, she also should not be mistaken for the American Businesswoman Sarah Miyazawa LaFleur.

Filmography

References

External links

Living people
Canadian expatriate actresses in the United States
Canadian film actresses
Canadian television actresses
Canadian video game actresses
Canadian voice actresses
20th-century Canadian actresses
21st-century Canadian actresses
Year of birth missing (living people)